Yotel is a hotel group based in the United Kingdom. The company's main shareholders include the Al-Bahar Group, Starwood Capital Group, United Investment Portugal and Kuwait Real Estate Company (AQARAT).

The company operates under three different brands: Yotel Air, Yotel and Yotel Pad.

History 
The first Yotel was opened in 2007 at Gatwick Airport, closely followed by one at Heathrow Airport. In 2009, Yotel opened a branch at Amsterdam Schiphol Airport and the company won the Business Accommodation of the Year award at the Business Travel World Awards.

On 13 June 2011, Yotel opened a hotel in New York City at 570 10th Ave, as a part of the $300 Million MiMA complex which includes residential units. Rockwell Group and Softroom designed the 669 rooms sized at  each. Yotel New York has a multi-bar  balcony, Terrace.

As of 2015, Yotel announced plans to expand to Boston, Dubai, Singapore (Orchard Road and Changi Airport), Paris (Charles De Gaulle), Miami, London and San Francisco.

In 2017, Yotel opened its city centre hotels in Boston and Singapore and begun construction in London. It also announced a further location in Amsterdam city centre.

Later in the year, Yotel formed a $250 million strategic partnership with Starwood Capital Group for a 30 percent stake in the company and the first city Yotel investment in Edinburgh was confirmed.

In 2018, Yotel launched its new brand: YotelPAD. PAD is extended stay properties, where guests can stay from one day up to a year. Yotel confirmed 6 new PAD developments in Park City, Dubai, Miami and Geneva.

Furthermore, the company announced properties in Glasgow and Istanbul New Airport.

In 2018, Yotel also forged a partnership with Plug and Play – a Silicon Valley innovation platform for start-ups, corporations and investors.

In 2019 & 2020, Yotel opened its first hotels in London, Edinburgh, Istanbul, San Francisco, Washington DC, Park City with plans to open Porto, Glasgow and Miami in 2021.  YOTEL will have 20 operating hotels by the end of 2021 with another 15 under construction.

In July 2022, Yotel announced plans to open its first hotel in Japan, a 244-room property in one of Tokyo's main shopping districts, Ginza.

In March 2023, Yotel announced it would open its first YotelPAD location outside of the U.S. in London, England. The hotel will open sometime in Q4 2023 and will be the company’s seventh overall property in the U.K. and third in London joining locations in London City and London Shoreditch.

Technology
Hotels have airline style self-check-in kiosks and keyless entry, convertible double beds, adjustable mood lighting and systems. Furthermore, the New York hotel is home to the YOBOT, the world's first robotic luggage concierge that has become a tourist attraction in itself.

The hotels in Boston and Singapore have delivery robots which take amenities to the rooms. These robots are programmed to negotiate lifts and corridors and they can interact with people.

Design
The Yotel concept came about when the founder was on a first-class flight and saw how it was possible to achieve a luxury feel in a compact space through the use of clever design and technology. The team enlisted the help of aircraft cabin designers Priestman Goode to design and build a prototype room known as a 'cabin'. The original prototype cabin was displayed at an exhibition called 100% Design in London.

References

Hotel chains
Hotel chains in the United Kingdom
Hotels established in 2007
British brands
Hotel and leisure companies based in London
2007 establishments in the United Kingdom